Illicit Dreams 2 is a 1997 American erotic thriller film directed by Fred Olen Ray and a sequel to Illicit Dreams. This film's music was composed by Bob Kulick. The film starred Tim Abell, Tane McClure, Cory Lane, Max Goldberg, Jennifer Burton and Christina Hempstead in the lead roles.

Cast
 Tim Abell as Jeff
 Tane McClure as Lynn Barrett
 Cory Lane as Terri
 Max Goldberg as Stan
 Jennifer Burton as Erica
 Robert Baldwin as Daniel
 Terry Burke as Leo
 Ross Hagen as Brady
 Brinke Stevens as Dianne
 Nikki Fritz as New York Woman
 Gregory Hustad as Paul
 Kevin Dean Williams as Cal
 Christopher Ray as Police Officer 
 Christina Hempstead as Secretary

References

External links
 
 

1990s English-language films
1997 films
1990s thriller drama films
American thriller drama films
American erotic thriller films
1990s erotic thriller films
1997 drama films
Films directed by Fred Olen Ray
1990s American films